Hollies Sing Hollies is the ninth studio album released in the UK by the Hollies. It was released in November 1969 by Parlophone. It was their second album that year, coming 6 months after an entire album of Bob Dylan covers. It was their first album of original compositions since the departure of Graham Nash. It was also the second album by the Hollies to feature Terry Sylvester and the first to feature his compositions, as well as an instrumental by bassist Bernie Calvert. The US version, titled "He Ain't Heavy, He's My Brother" (with a different cover photo), included the hit single of the same name, while omitting the tracks "Soldier's Dilemma" and "Marigold: Gloria Swansong".  The UK album did not chart, but its US version peaked at number 32.

Track listing

He Ain't Heavy, He's My Brother (US version)

The US version of Hollies Sing Hollies was renamed He Ain't Heavy, He's My Brother with a different full cover art, and was released in December 1969 by Epic Records. It included the hit single "He Ain't Heavy, He's My Brother" and omitted two tracks from the UK version, "Soldier's Dilemma" and "Marigold: Gloria Swansong" (the second was saved for their next US album, Moving Finger).
Side one
 "Why Didn't You Believe?"
 "Don't Give Up Easily"
 "Look at Life"
 "Please Sign Your Letters"
 "My Life is Over with You"
 "Please Let Me Please"

Side two
 "Do You Believe In Love"
 "He Ain't Heavy, He's My Brother"
 "You Love 'Cos You Like It"
 "Reflections of a Time Long Past"
 "Goodbye Tomorrow"

Personnel
The Hollies
Allan Clarke - vocals, harmonica
Tony Hicks - lead guitar, vocals
Terry Sylvester - guitar, vocals
Bernie Calvert - bass, keyboards
Bobby Elliott - drums

References

1969 albums
The Hollies albums
Parlophone albums
Albums produced by Ron Richards (producer)